The Ross Creek, part of the Ross River catchment, is the small estuarine portion of the Ross River, as it serves as a bay inlet that separates the Townsville central business district from Ross Island. The creek is located in the lower reaches of the river catchment, in the city confines of Townsville, in North Queensland, Australia.

Course and features
The only passage across Ross Creek was by ferry until Victoria Bridge was completed in 1889. Ross Creek was the only port for Townsville until 1892, at which time the outer harbour was constructed. Vessels from interstate and overseas moored in Cleveland Bay and passengers were transferred to the northern shore of the creek by lighters.

See also

 Rivers of Queensland

References

Geography of Townsville
Rivers of Queensland